This is a list of the Duchesses and Grand Duchesses; the consorts of the Duke Mecklenburg and later the Grand Duke of Mecklenburg-Schwerin and Strelitz

Duchess of Mecklenburg

Mecklenburg-Schwerin Line (III)

Mecklenburg-Strelitz Line

Grand Duchess of Mecklenburg

Mecklenburg-Schwerin Line (III)

Mecklenburg-Strelitz Line

Titular Grand Duchess of Mecklenburg (since 1918)

Mecklenburg-Schwerin Line (III)

Mecklenburg-Strelitz Line

See also
List of Dukes and Grand Dukes of Mecklenburg

Mecklenburg
House of Mecklenburg
Duchesses of Mecklenburg-Schwerin
Duchesses of Mecklenburg-Strelitz
Grand Duchesses of Mecklenburg-Schwerin
Grand Duchesses of Mecklenburg-Strelitz